Elgin is the seventh studio album by American R&B singer Ginuwine. It was released by Notifi Music Group and E1 Music on February 15, 2011. His second album with Notifit, the album takes its title from Ginuwine's first name, the singer worked with producers Bryan-Michael Cox, Tapping Warren, Kendrick Dean, Melvin "Saint Nick" Coleman, MaddScientist, and Tank on the album. Songwriter and rapper Katrina "Trina" Taylor appears as a guest voalist on the album track "Batteries."

The album received a mixed reception by music critics, many of whom praised Ginuwine's vocal performances and the album's trend-detaching nature but found its lyrics unsuitable and cliché-addled. Upon its release, Elgin debuted at number 30 on the US Billboard 200, and at number seven on Billboards Top R&B/Hip-Hop Albums chart with first week sales of 19,100 copies. The album produced three singles, including lead single "What Could Have Been" as well as "Heaven" and "Body."

Singles
The album was preceded by lead single "What Could Have Been", released on October 25, 2010. The song peaked at number 61 on the US Hot R&B/Hip-Hop Songs chart and reached top 20 on the Adult R&B Songs, peaking at number 15. A second single, "Heaven," was released in January 2011, but failed to chart. Ginuwine also filmed and released two promo music videos for "Break" and "Drink of Choice". "Body" served as the third single from the album.

Critical reception

Allison Stewart, writing for The Washington Post, called the album "a solid if slightly anonymous disc that makes plain the problems facing veteran balladeers. Ginuwine got older, got married and gradually began to emphasize the crooner side of his persona, just as electro-centric R&B began to gain traction. And now he's stuck, his limber, velvet ribbon of a voice forced to resort to making unctuous Diane Warren ballads seem sincere and interesting and mostly not succeeding, while Ne-Yo has all the fun." Lauren Carter from The Boston Herald remarked that "the majority of the 40-year-old’s seventh album is smoothed-out adult contemporary fare that ranges from steamy to snoozy." She found that "despite the lapses in songwriting, Ginuwine's voice retains an emotive, almost haunting, quality and frequently shines."

AllMusic editor Andy Kellman rated the album three out of five stars and found that while a handful of "tracks would be better suited for younger singers, roughly half the album has Ginuwine acting his age, dealing with adult situations [...] Best of all is "Frozen"; audible shivering sounds overstate the mood projected by a scorned object of affection, but frost-coated synthesizers provide great contrast to Ginuwine's sympathetic pleading." Mark Edward Nero from About.com called the album "stylish [and] sophisticated," but found that "unfortunately some of the albums songs lack the passion of his earlier releases [...] It's actually the more uptempo tracks on Elgin that please the most [...] Ginuwine could have tried to hop on the latest trends with this album in an effort to attract more young listeners, but to his credit, he acts his age throughout Elgin and shows that he's still got the power as a vocalist to charm the masses, even if his songs lack some of the creativity of his youth."

Chart performance
Elgin debuted at number 30 on the US Billboard 200 and number seven on the Top R&B/Hip-Hop Albums chart, with 19,100 copies sold in the first week. It marked Ginuwine's lowest opening sales up to then and was a considerable decline from his previous effort A Man's Thoughts, which had opened to sales of 38,000 units in 2009.

Track listing

Personnel
Credits lifted from the liner notes of Elgin.

 Rebecca Alexis – Stylist
 Durrell Babbs – Composer
 Joseph "Lonny" Bereal – Composer
 Jayshawn Champion – Composer, Vocals (Background)
 Ted Clinkscale – Composer
 Melvin Coleman – Composer, Programming
 Melvin "Saint Nick" Coleman – Composer, Producer
 Bryan-Michael Cox – Arranger,  Executive Producer, Producer
 Kendrick Dean – Composer
 Ira Dewitt – Executive Producer
 Earnest "Bishop Young Don" Dixon – Composer
 Daniel Farris – Composer
 Darryl Farris – Composer
 Davion Farris – Composer
 Sean Fenton – Composer
 Jerry "Texx" Franklin – Composer
 Brian Gardner – Mastering
 Stephen Garnett – Photography
 Ginuwine – Primary Artist, Vocals (Background)
 Roz Harell – A&R
 R.L. Huggar – Composer, Vocals (Background)
 Olivier "Oli" Jean Joseph – Composer
 Keith Ketcham – Art Direction, Design
 Elgin Lumpkin – Composer
 Riley Mackin – Engineer, Mixing
 John McGee – Composer, Producer
 Michael Naylor – Composer, Producer
 Robert Newt – Composer
 Saint Nick – Composer, Vocal Producer, Vocals (Background)
 Reginald Saunders – Composer
 Adonis Shropshire – Composer
 Myles Sims – Composer
 James "J-Doe" Smith – Composer
 James "Jayshawn" Smith – Composer
 Ced Solo – Producer
 Cedric Solomon – Composer
 Kristina Stephens – Composer
 Tank – Vocals (Background)
 Katrina Taylor – Composer
 Sam Thomas – Engineer, Mixing
 Atozzio Towns – Composer, Vocals (Background)
 J. Valentine – Composer
 Diane Warren – Composer, Lyricist
 Wayne Wells – Composer
 Tyler Widman – Mixing
 Young Yonny – Producer

Charts

Release history

References

2011 albums
Ginuwine albums
Albums produced by Bryan-Michael Cox